Troy Edwin Stradford (born September 11, 1964) is a former professional American football running back who was selected by the Miami Dolphins in the fourth round of the 1987 NFL Draft. Stradford won the 1987 Offensive Rookie of the Year Award for the Dolphins and played for Miami until the end of the 1990 season. He lasted just two more years in the NFL and played for the Kansas City Chiefs, the Detroit Lions, and the Los Angeles Rams from 1991 to 1992.

Stradford grew up in Linden, New Jersey and played both basketball and football at Linden High School.

Stradford currently works as a Sports talk show host on WFTL 640 Sports radio weekdays from 10AM-12PM and as the host of the Gameday Insiders heard weekends on WFTL 640 and WFTL 850 in Fort Lauderdale, Florida.

Professional statistics

References

1964 births
Living people
American football running backs
Boston College Eagles football players
Miami Dolphins players
Kansas City Chiefs players
Detroit Lions players
Linden High School (New Jersey) alumni

Los Angeles Rams players
National Football League Offensive Rookie of the Year Award winners
Sportspeople from Elizabeth, New Jersey
People from Linden, New Jersey
Players of American football from New Jersey